O'Sullivan may refer to:

People
 O'Sullivan family, a gaelic Irish clan
 O'Sullivan (surname), a family name

Places
 O'Sullivan Dam, Washington, United States
 O'Sullivan River, Quebec, Canada
 O'Sullivan Army Heliport, California, United States
 O'Sullivan Beach, South Australia

Other uses
 O'Sullivan College, a private university in Canada
 O'Sullivan Ladies Open, an LPGA golf tournament
 O'Sullivan test, a diabetes screening test
 O'Sullivan v Noarlunga Meat Ltd, a series of Australian High Court cases

See also
 Sullivan (disambiguation)